The exponential mechanism is a technique for designing differentially private algorithms. It was developed by Frank McSherry and Kunal Talwar in 2007. Their work was recognized as a co-winner of the 2009 PET Award for Outstanding Research in Privacy Enhancing Technologies.

Most of the initial research in the field of differential privacy revolved around real-valued functions which have relatively low sensitivity to change in the data of a single individual and whose usefulness is not hampered by small additive perturbations. A natural question is what happens in the situation when one wants to preserve more general sets of properties. The exponential mechanism helps to extend the notion of differential privacy to address these issues. Moreover, it describes a class of mechanisms that includes all possible differentially private mechanisms.

The mechanism

Algorithm 
In very generic terms, a privacy mechanism maps a set of  inputs from domain  to a range . The map may be randomized, in which case each element of the domain  corresponds to a probability distribution over the range . Let us define a function . The score reflects the appeal of the pair , i.e. the higher the score, the more appealing the pair is.  
Given the input , the mechanism's objective is to return an  such that the function  is approximately maximized. To achieve this, set up the mechanism  as follows: 
Ignoring the base measure  then the value  which maximizes  has the highest probability. Moreover, this mechanism is differentially private. Proof of this claim will follow. One technicality that should be kept in mind is that in order to properly define  the  should be finite.

Theorem (differential privacy):  gives -differential privacy.

Thus, the ratio of the new probability density (i.e. with new ) and the earlier one is at most .

Accuracy 

Proof: The probability  is at most , as the denominator can be at most one. Since both the probabilities have the same normalizing term so,

By hypothesis, . Substituting the value of  we get this probability to be at least . Multiplying with  yields the desired bound.

Example application

Before we get into the details of the example let us define some terms which we will be using extensively throughout our discussion.

Definition (global sensitivity): The global sensitivity of a query  is its maximum difference when evaluated on two neighbouring datasets :

 

Definition: A predicate query  for any predicate  is defined to be

Note that  for any predicate .

Release mechanism 

The following is due to Avrim Blum, Katrina Ligett and Aaron Roth.

Informally, it means that with high probability the query  will behave in a similar way on the original dataset  and on the synthetic dataset . 
Consider a common problem in Data Mining. Assume there is a database  with  entries. Each entry consist of -tuples of the form  where . Now, a user wants to learn a linear halfspace of the form . In essence the user wants to figure out the values of  such that maximum number of tuples in the database satisfy the inequality. The algorithm we describe below can generate a synthetic database  which will allow the user to learn (approximately) the same linear half-space while querying on this synthetic database. The motivation for such an algorithm being that the new database will be generated in a differentially private manner and thus assure privacy to the individual records in the database .

In this section we show that it is possible to release a dataset which is useful for concepts from a polynomial VC-Dimension class and at the same time adhere to -differential privacy as long as the size of the original dataset is at least polynomial on the VC-Dimension of the concept class. To state formally:

Theorem: For any class of functions  and any dataset  such that

we can output an -useful dataset  that preserves -differential privacy. As we had mentioned earlier the algorithm need not be efficient.

One interesting fact is that the algorithm which we are going to develop generates a synthetic dataset whose size is independent of the original dataset; in fact, it only depends on the VC-dimension of the concept class and the parameter . The algorithm outputs a dataset of size 

We borrow the Uniform Convergence Theorem from combinatorics and state a corollary of it which aligns to our need.

Lemma: Given any dataset  there exists a dataset  of size  such that .

Proof:

We know from the uniform convergence theorem that

 

where probability is over the distribution of the dataset. 
Thus, if the RHS is less than one then we know for sure that the data set  exists. To bound the RHS to less than one we need , where  is some positive constant. Since we stated earlier that we will output a dataset of size , so using this bound on  we get . Hence the lemma.

Now we invoke the exponential mechanism.

From the exponential mechanism we know this preserves -differential privacy. Let's get back to the proof of the Theorem.

We define .

Let  the event that the exponential mechanism outputs some dataset  such that .

 the event that the exponential mechanism outputs some dataset  such that .

Now setting this quantity to be at least , we find that it suffices to have

And hence we prove the theorem.

Applications in other domains 

In the above example of the usage of exponential mechanism, one can output a synthetic dataset in a differentially private manner and can use the dataset to answer queries with good accuracy. Other private mechanisms, such as posterior sampling, which returns parameters rather than datasets, can be made equivalent to the exponential one.

Apart from the setting of privacy, the exponential mechanism has also been studied in the context of auction theory and classification algorithms. In the case of auctions the exponential mechanism helps to achieve a truthful auction setting.

References

External links
 The Algorithmic Foundations of Differential Privacy by Cynthia Dwork and Aaron Roth, 2014.

Information privacy
Theory of cryptography
Applied probability
Differential privacy